Anton Janda (1 May 1904 – 1986) was an Austrian football defender who played for Austria in the 1934 FIFA World Cup. He also played for FC Admira Wacker Mödling.

After his career he became coach of  SC Austro Fiat Vienna. After the Second World War he coached FC Zell am See, SV Austria Salzburg in the Salzburg province, Heiligenstädter SV and Austria XIII in Vienna.

References

1904 births
1986 deaths
Austrian footballers
Austria international footballers
Association football defenders
FC Admira Wacker Mödling players
1934 FIFA World Cup players
Footballers from Vienna